Ravivasriya Hindustan is an Indian weekly newspapers which is the highest circulated weekly newspaper in India. It is owned by Hindustan Media Ventures. It publishes from Patna, Delhi, Lucknow, Muzaffarpur, Bhagalpur, Kanpur, Meerut, Varanasi, Ranchi, Agra, Dhanbad and Moradabad.

References 

Weekly newspapers
Weekly newspapers published in India
Newspapers published in India